In Turkey, Defence Industry Agency ( (SSB)); formerly Presidency of Defense Industries and Undersecretariat for Defence Industries (SSM) before that, is a civil institution established by the government to manage the Defense industry of Turkey and the supply of military technology. It was established under Law No. 3238 on 7 November 1985 under the name of "Defense Industry Development and Support Administration Office".

The Presidency has close relations with the Office of the President of Turkey, the Ministry of National Defense and the Turkish Armed Forces, as well as domestic and foreign defense industry companies. In addition to supporting projects and products based on domestic design and production, SSB gives importance to technological transfer of products and services acquired from foreign suppliers.

On 10 July 2018, it became affiliated with the Office of the President with the Presidential Decree No. 1 and its name was changed to "Presidency of Defense Industries".

On 14 December 2020, the United States Department of State issued sanctions against the Turkish Defense Industry including "prohibition on granting specific U.S. export licenses and authorizations for any goods or technology transferred to SSB".

On 16 May 2022, the agency has updated their logo and changed its English name to Defence Industry Agency from Presidency of Defense Industries; however the original Turkish name -Savunma Sanayii Başkanlığı- has been left untouched. At the same date, a new logo has been introduced to be more integrated with other agencies and presidencies of Turkey.

Departments 
 Personnel and Education Department
 Strategy Development Department
 Procurement Management Department
 Administrative and Financial Affairs Department
 Department of Industrialization
 R&D and Technology Management Department
 Quality-Testing and Certification Department
 International Cooperation Department
 Land Vehicles Department
 Marine Vehicles Department
 Department of Aircraft
 Helicopter Department
 Communications Electronics and Information Systems Department
 Space Department
 Weapon Systems Department
 Electronic Warfare and Radar Systems Department
 Unmanned and Intelligent Systems Department

List of presidents

See also 
 National Security Council
 Agency for Defense Development - South Korea
 Defense Advanced Research Projects Agency - United States
 Defence Research and Development Organisation - India
 Defence Technology Institute - Thailand
 Military Institute of Armament Technology - Poland
 National Chung-Shan Institute of Science and Technology - Taiwan
 Rafael Advanced Defense Systems - Israel
 Swedish Defence Research Agency - Sweden

References

External links 
 Presidency of Defense Industries website

Government agencies of Turkey
Turkish military-related lists